Remunerative Approach for Agriculture and Allied sector Rejuvenation, previously Rashtriya Krishi Vikas Yojana is a State Plan Scheme of Additional Central Assistance, was launched in August 2007 as a part of the 11th Five Year Plan by the Government of India. Launched under the aegis of the National Development Council, it seeks to achieve 4% annual growth in agriculture through development of Agriculture and its allied sectors (as defined by the Planning Commission) during the period under the 11th Five Year Plan (2007–11).

Aims
This programme is essentially a State Plan Scheme that seeks to provide the States and Territories of India with the autonomy to draw up plans for increased public investment in Agriculture by incorporating information on local requirements, geographical/climatic conditions, available natural resources/ technology and cropping patterns in their districts so as to significantly increase the productivity of Agriculture and its allied sectors and eventually maximize the returns of farmers in agriculture and its allied sectors.

Eligibility
A State is eligible for funding under the RKVY if it maintains or increases the percentage of its expenditure on Agriculture and its Allied Sectors with respect to the total State Plan Expenditure, where the Base Line (which will move every year) for this expenditure is the average of the percentage of expenditure incurred by a State Government for the previous three years on Agriculture and its Allied Sectors minus any funds related to Agriculture and its allied sectors that it may already have received in that time under its State Plan.

Consider the following hypothetical situation where a State seeks eligibility under the RKVY for the year 2010-11. 

To be eligible for funding under the RKVY for the year 2010-11, the State must have a percentage of expenditure higher than the average of years 2007-08,08-09 and 09-10 .

As the percentage of expenditure in 2010-11 is higher than the baseline percentage by 0.6%, the State is eligible for allocation of funds under the RKVY.

If the expenditure in subsequent years falls below the base line, the resources required to complete projects started under the RKVY will now have to be provided by the State Government.

Funding
It was decided that  would be released by the Central Government every year under the 11th Five Year Plan and  would be allocated in 2007-08.

Status of release during 2016-17

Performance
In a press release by the Press Information Bureau dated 24 March 2011, a number of Indian states reported a significantly large increase in agricultural outlay as given below:

Additions
On 17 June 2010, the Government of India announced that it would include Sericulture and Allied activities to boost production of high quality silk and contribute to the global market in a larger way to combat the declining trend of Sericulture productivity.

See also
 Ministry of Agriculture (India)

References

External links
 Rashtriya Krishi Vikas Yojana - Official Site
 Planning Commission - Official Site
 Press Information Bureau, Government of India

Government schemes in India
Agricultural finance in India
Ministry of Agriculture & Farmers' Welfare